The Valais Blacknose, is a breed of domestic sheep originating in the Valais region of Switzerland. It is a dual-purpose breed, raised both for meat and for wool.

History 

The breed originates in the mountains of the canton of Valais – from which its name derives – and of the Bernese Oberland. It is documented as far back as the fifteenth century, but the present German name was not used before 1884; the breed standard dates from 1962. In the past there was some cross-breeding with imported sheep, in the nineteenth century of Bergamasca and Cotswold stock, and in the twentieth century of the Southdown breed.

Characteristics 

The Schwarznasenschaf is a mountain breed, well adapted to grazing on the stony pastures of its area of origin. Both rams and ewes are horned.

Use 
The Valais Blacknose is a dual-purpose breed, reared for both meat and wool.

See also 
 Scottish Blackface

References

External links 

Sheep breeds
Sheep breeds originating in Switzerland